Shake the Snow Globe (stylized in all caps) is the fourteenth studio album by American rapper Russ. It was released on January 31, 2020 through Diemon and Columbia Records. The deluxe edition was later released on May 19, 2020. It features guest appearances from Benny the Butcher, Bia, Boogie, Bugus, Devin the Dude, Kiana Ledé, Rick Ross, and Ty Dolla Sign. The production on the album was mostly handled by Russ, but also featured production by Boi-1da, Illmind, Scott Storch, Sevn Thomas, Jahaan Sweet and Murda Beatz among others.

Shake the Snow Globe was supported by four singles: "Civil War", "Paranoid", "Summer at 7" and "Best on Earth". The album received critical acclaim reviews from music critics and was also a commercial success. The album opened at number four on the US Billboard 200 chart, earning 63,000 album-equivalent units in its first week.

Critical reception
Shake the Snow Globe was met with widespread acclaim. At Album of the Year, the album received an average score of 83 out of 100, based on three reviews.

Writing for NME, Will Lavin gave the album a positive review, praising a new melody driven focus and his ever-present uncompromising lyrical content. The writer also praising the album's consistency saying it's his most consistent album to date. Lavin also talked about his "prioritizing features from up-and-coming talent over established marquee names". Furthermore, Lavin said that "‘Shake The Snow Globe’ is unique. Consistent from start to finish, it's a more complete body of work than 2018's ‘Zoo’".

Commercial performance
Shake the Snow Globe debuted at number four on the US Billboard 200 chart, earning 63,000 album-equivalent units (including 39,000 copies in pure album sales) in its first week. This became Russ' third consecutive US top-ten album.

Track listing
Credits adapted from Tidal.

Credits adapted from Tidal.

Notes
  signifies a co-producer
  signifies an additional producer
 All track titles are stylized in all caps
 "Patience" contains additional vocals by Nicole Ariana

Charts

Weekly charts

Year-end charts

Certifications

References

2020 albums
Russ (rapper) albums
Albums produced by Boi-1da
Albums produced by Illmind
Albums produced by Murda Beatz
Columbia Records albums